Stefan Kuczyński may refer to:

  (1938–2010), Polish historian
 Stefan Maria Kuczyński (1904–1985), Polish historian